Giovanni Battista Cungi (active, 1538 - 1542) was an Italian painter of the late-Renaissance or Mannerist period, active mainly in Florence and Tuscany.

Biography
He was born in Borgo San Sepolcro and pupil of Giorgio Vasari, for whom in 1538 he made designs from Roman monuments, specifically grotteschi. He then aided Cristoforo Gherardi in the decoration, with mythologic subjects and grotteschi, of the Castello Bufalini in San Giustino in Umbria. An Annunciation by Cungi is present in the Museo Civico di Sansepolcro.

References

Year of birth unknown
Year of death unknown
People from Sansepolcro
16th-century Italian painters
Italian male painters
Painters from Tuscany
Italian Renaissance painters
Mannerist painters